Khao Phing Kan or Ko Khao Phing Kan is an island in Thailand, in Phang Nga Bay northeast of Phuket.

The islands are limestone karst towers and are a part of Ao Phang Nga National Park. Since 1974, when they were featured in the James Bond movie The Man with the Golden Gun, Khao Phing Kan and Ko Ta Puboth separately and collectivelyhave been popularly called James Bond Island.

Etymology
Khao Phing Kan means "hills leaning against each other" in Thai, reflecting the connected nature of the islands. Khao Ta Pu can be literally translated as "crab's eye" island, and Ko Tapu can be translated as "nail" or "spike" island, reflecting its shape. With koh meaning "island" and khao meaning "hill", the terms ko, khao, and Ko Khao are frequently interchanged in the naming of the islands. After appearing in the 1974 James Bond movie The Man with the Golden Gun, Khao Phing Kan and sometimes Ko Ta Pu became widely referred to as James Bond Island, especially in tourist guides, and their original names are rarely used by locals.

History
Before 1974, the island was a rarely visited indigenous area. However, it was chosen as one of the locations for the 1974 James Bond film The Man with the Golden Gun as the hideout for Bond's antagonist, Francisco Scaramanga. After the movie release it turned into a popular tourist destination. Popularity and increased tourism left Khao Phing Kan with substantial litter.

In 1981, the island became the most famous part of the newly established Ao Phang Nga Marine National Park. Since 1998, it is forbidden for tourist boats to approach Ko Ta Pu. This measure aims to stop erosion of the limestone rocks on and near the islet that might eventually result in the island's collapse.

Geography

Khao Phing Kan
Khao Phing Kan consists of two forest-covered islands with steep shores. They lie in the northwestern part of Phang Nga Bay,  from the mainland, amid a group of a dozen of other islands. The island has a few caves and two sandy beaches, in the southwest and between the twin islands. The former hosts the government office where every visitor has to pay a tax. The latter is used as the port for the tourist boats arriving from the mainland and has several souvenir shops selling items like coral and shells and plastic-encased butterflies, scorpions, and spiders. The Thai name for Khao Phing Kan reflects the particular shape of the island which appears as if a flat limestone cliff tumbled sideways and leaned on a similar rock in the centre of the island.

Waters around the island are only a few metres deep and are pale-green in colour. The bottom is covered with silt, brought to the Phang Nga Bay by several rivers from the north.

Ko Ta Pu

A local legend explains the formation of Ko Ta Pu as follows. Once upon a time, there lived a fisherman who used to bring home many fish every time he went to the sea. However, one day he could not catch any fish despite many attempts and only picked up a nail with his net. He kept throwing the nail back into the sea and catching it again. Furious, he took his sword and cut the nail in half with all his strength. Upon impact, one half of the nail jumped up and speared into the sea, forming Ko Ta Pu.

A scientific version of the Ko Ta Pu formation says that in the Permian period, the area was a barrier reef. Then, upon tectonic movements, it ruptured, and its parts were dispersed over the area and flooded by the rising ocean. Wind, waves, water currents, and tides gradually eroded the islands thus formed, sometimes producing peculiar shapes, such as Ko Ta Pu. Tide-related erosion is visible at the bottom of the rock.

In the James Bond film The Man with the Golden Gun, Francisco Scaramanga describes Ko Ta Pu as a "mushroom-shaped rock", which houses two large solar panels that come up on top of Ko Ta Pu and lock on to the Sun.

Ko Ta Pu is also featured in another James Bond film (Tomorrow Never Dies, identified as in Vietnam) and in the Italian film Quo Vado? (identified as in the Philippines).

Climate
The area has a tropical monsoon climate, which is characterized by frequent rains and stable temperature. According to the data collected between 1961 and 1990, average number of rainy days is 189 per year bringing  of precipitation, mostly between May and October.

Flora and fauna

Most of the island is covered with deciduous limestone shrubland and evergreen trees. Some plants, such as Pandanus, cycads, and euphorbs grow on nearly soil-free cliffs, such as those of Ko Ta Pu, penetrating their roots into the numerous cracks and surviving on rainwater.

Shallow water depth, warm, stable temperature, and rich nutrient supply from mangrove forests and several rivers running into Phang Nga Bay result in abundant plankton and other marine life. The bay island hosts 26 species of reptiles, 24 species of fish, 14 species of shrimp, 15 species of crab, and 16 species of manta rays, sharks, and game fish. Most fishes are typical of coral reefs, such as butterflyfish. Other common inhabitants are blue crab, swimming crab, mudskipper, humpback shrimp, mud lobster, pomfret, sole, anchovy, scad, rock cod, rainbow cuttlefish, soft cuttlefish, musk crab, mackerel, moray eel, puffer fish, rabbitfish, groupers, black sea cucumber, brain coral, staghorn coral and flowerlike soft coral. Amphibians include Fejervarya raja, cricket frog (Fejervarya limnocharis) and the common tree frog. Aquatic plants are represented by red algae, Halimeda, seagrass, and plant plankton. There are more than 100 species of birds in the area such as the striated heron, Pacific reef heron, little egret and others.

See also
List of islands of Thailand
List of James Bond film locations
James Bond Beach

References

External links

 Khao Phing Kan: Ao Phang Nga National Park, Thailand.

Geography of Phang Nga province
Islands of Thailand
Stacks (geology)
James Bond